Magnolia Cemetery is a  cemetery in Baton Rouge, Louisiana.

Description
The cemetery is located at 422 North 19th Street and is bordered on the north by Main Street and on the south by Florida Boulevard.  The west and east sides are bordered by 19th Street and 22nd Street, respectively. The land for the cemetery was purchased by the town of Baton Rouge from John Christian Buhler Jr, in August 1852, with burials in the area dating back to the 1820s according to some sources. The cemetery was the site of intense fighting during the Battle of Baton Rouge on August 5, 1862; a commemorative ceremony is held at the cemetery each August. It was turned over to the city of Baton Rouge in 1947 and is now administered by the Recreation and Park Commission for the Parish of East Baton Rouge (BREC).

Magnolia Cemetery was added to National Register of Historic Places on January 31, 1985.

Notable burials
This cemetery was the main burial site for most prominent citizens of Baton Rouge, white and African-American, from 1820s to the 1970s and burials continue to the present. These include sugar planter and philanthropist John Hill (1824–1910), novelist Lyle Saxon (1891–1946), and "Florence Nightengal of the South" Confederate nurse Joanna Fox Waddill (1838–1899).

Among the noteworthy politicians buried here are:

 US Congressman Thomas Withers Chinn (1791–1852)
 Whig politician James M. Elam (1796–1856) and his son James Essex Elam (1829–1873)
 Four-time Mayor of Baton Rouge, former Register of State Lands Ellen Bryan Moore (1912–1999)
 Cecil Morgan (1898–1999), the state representative who moved to impeach Huey Pierce Long Jr.
 6th District Congressman Edward White Robertson (1823–1887) and his son Congressman Samuel Matthews Robertson (1852–1911)
 5th District Congressman William B. Spencer (1835–1882)

See also
 Baton Rouge National Cemetery
 National Register of Historic Places listings in East Baton Rouge Parish, Louisiana

References

External links

 
 BREC Magnolia Cemetery page

Cemeteries on the National Register of Historic Places in Louisiana
Protected areas of East Baton Rouge Parish, Louisiana
Louisiana in the American Civil War
Tourist attractions in Baton Rouge, Louisiana
Geography of Baton Rouge, Louisiana
Buildings and structures in Baton Rouge, Louisiana
National Register of Historic Places in Baton Rouge, Louisiana
1852 establishments in Louisiana